Kallymenia ercegovicii a red algae species first discovered in the Mediterranean Sea, in the coast of Croatia.

Description
This species is distinguished from other Kallymenia species by a deeply lobed thallus, its large inner cortical cells, stellate but non-ganglionic medullary cells and non-ostiolate cystocarps which are surrounded by a filamentous net, itself composed of elongated cells forming fascicles.

References

Further reading
Giaccone, Giuseppe. "Biodiversity of the Mediterranean Sea: an introductory speech to the Marine Algae Symposium." Bocconea Palermo 16 (2003): 182–192.
Belsher, Th, et al. "Inventaire des algues marines benthiques de la rade et des îles d'Hyères." Trav. scient. Parc natn. Port-Cros 2 (1976): 39–89.

External links 

 AlgaeBase entry

Kallymeniaceae
Plants described in 2014